Nimrod is a biblical king.

Nimrod may also refer to:

Fictional characters
 Nimrod Gaunt, a character from Philip Kerr's Children of the Lamp
 Nimrod (Doctor Who), a villain in Doctor Who audio plays
 Nimrod (vampire), a vampire from the black-and-white Marvel Comics Dracula Lives! series
 Nimrod (comics), a fictional robot mutant-hunter from Marvel Comics' Uncanny X-Men series
 Nimrod or Nim, a reptile in the television series Surface
 Nimrod the Scarlet Sentinel, a villain in Mighty Morphin Power Rangers
 Nimrod, a character from Robert Ludlum's The Matlock Paper

Military
 HMS Nimrod, six ships of the Royal Navy
 Hawker Nimrod, a 1930s British fighter aircraft
 Hawker Siddeley Nimrod, a Royal Air Force maritime patrol aircraft, 1969–2011
 BAE Systems Nimrod MRA4, a planned upgrade of the Hawker Siddeley Nimrod, developed in the 2000s
 British Aerospace Nimrod AEW3, a planned AEW version of the Hawker Siddeley Nimrod, developed in the late 1970s/early 1980s
 40M Nimród, a Hungarian anti-aircraft tank from World War II
 Nimrod (missile), an Israeli anti-tank guided missile
 Operation Nimrod, the SAS assault during the Iranian Embassy siege, London, 1980

Music
 Nimrod (album), a 1997 album by Green Day
 Variation IX (Adagio) "Nimrod", the famous 9th variation in the 1899 composition Enigma Variations by Edward Elgar
 Nimrod, a band fronted by Zev Asher

People
 Charles James Apperley (1777–1843), English sportsman and author, pseudonym Nimrod
 Nimrod Ping (1947–2006), politician in Brighton, England
 Nimród Antal (born 1973), Hungarian-American film director
 Nimrod Kamer, satirist and journalist
 Nimrod Levi (born 1995), Israeli basketball player
 Nimrod Mashiah (born 1988), Israeli windsurfer
 Nimrod Megiddo, Israeli mathematician and computer scientist
 Nimrod Shapira Bar-Or (born 1989), Israeli Olympic swimmer
 Nimrod Tishman (born 1991), Israeli basketball player

Places
 Nimrod Province, Afghanistan
 Valley of Nimrod, referenced in the Book of Mormon
 Nimrod city, an ancient city in Mesopotamia
 Nemrut (volcano) in east Turkey

Antarctica
 Nimrod Glacier
 Mount Nimrod, in Ross Dependency

Golan Heights
 Nimrod, Golan Heights, an Israeli settlement and village
 Nimrod Fortress

United States
 Nimrod, Arkansas
 Nimrod, Minnesota
 Nimrod, Montana
 Nimrod, Oregon
 Nimrod, Texas

Science and technology
 Nimrod (computer), an early computer to play Nim
 Nimrod (distributed computing), a tool for distributed parametric modelling
 Nimrod (synchrotron), a proton synchrotron which operated at the Rutherford Appleton Laboratory until 1978
 Nimrod (programming language), former name of Nim
 Project NIMROD, a meteorological field study

Vehicles
List of ships named Nimrod
 Nimrod (ship), the ship used by Ernest Shackleton during his 1908 Antarctic expedition
 Nimrod Expedition, to the Antarctic
 Nimrod Racing Automobiles, a British racing constructor and team formed through a partnership with Aston Martin
 Nimrod NRA/C2, a racing car built by Nimrod Racing Automobiles

Other uses
 Nimrod International Journal of Prose and Poetry, a literary journal published by the University of Tulsa
 Nimrods, a mascot for Watersmeet Township, Michigan's schools
 Nimrod, a dramatic poem by Robert William Jameson

See also
 Nimrud (disambiguation)

Aramaic-language names